Chris Ewan (born 6 October 1976) is a British crime and mystery writer. He is best known for his "Good Thief" series of travelling adventures featuring Charlie Howard, a thief and author of his own crime series.

Ewan was born in Taunton, Somerset, and lived on the Isle of Man with his family before moving back to Somerset. Ewan studied American Literature at the University of Nottingham.

He is published by Simon & Schuster and Faber and Faber in the UK, and St. Martin's Press in the United States. His first novel, The Good Thief's Guide to Amsterdam (2007), won the Long Barn Books First Novel Award. His first and second novels, The Good Thief's Guide to Amsterdam and The Good Thief's Guide to Paris, were shortlisted for the Last Laugh Award for best comic crime fiction. The audiobook of The Good Thief's Guide to Vegas, read by Simon Vance, was nominated for an Audie Award in 2013. His latest work in the series is The Good Thief's Guide to Berlin. The Good Thief's Guides are being developed for TV by 20th Century Fox Studios for ABC.

Ewan's thriller Safe House, set on the Isle of Man, has sold over 500,000 copies  and was shortlisted for the Theakston's Old Peculier Crime Novel of the Year.

Novels 
The Good Thief's Guide to Amsterdam (2007)
The Good Thief's Guide to Paris (2009)
The Good Thief's Guide to Vegas (2010)
The Good Thief's Guide to Venice (2011)
Safe House (2011)
The Good Thief's Guide to Berlin (2013)
Dead Line (2013)
Dark Tides (2015)
Long Time Lost (2016)
A Window Breaks (2020)

References

External links 
 http://www.chrisewan.com
https://web.archive.org/web/20131128210940/http://www.faber.co.uk/catalog/author/chris-ewan
 https://web.archive.org/web/20110116221034/http://authors.simonandschuster.co.uk/Chris-Ewan/65784703
 http://us.macmillan.com/author/chrisewan
 Dead Line review at Upcoming4.me
 Dark Tides review at Upcoming4.me

1976 births
British crime writers
Living people
British mystery writers
People from Taunton